The Town of Manzanola is a Statutory Town in Otero County, Colorado, United States.  The town population was 434 at the 2010 United States Census.

Description
A post office called Manzanola has been in operation since 1895.  The town was named for an orchard near the original town site, Manzanola being a name derived from Spanish meaning "red apple".

Manzanola was previously known as Town of Grams Ranch, Town of Apishipa, and the Town of Catlin, in consecutive order.

Geography
Manzanola is located at  (38.109096, -103.867739).

Demographics

As of the census of 2000, there were 525 people, 189 households, and 120 families residing in the town. The racial makeup of the town was 74.48% White, 0.57% African American, 1.14% Native American, 0.57% Asian, 20.76% from other races, and 2.48% from two or more races. Hispanic or Latino of any race were 45.14% of the population.

There were 189 households, out of which 30.2% had children under the age of 18 living with them, 45.0% were married couples living together, 12.7% had a female householder with no husband present, and 36.5% were non-families. 31.2% of all households were made up of individuals, and 16.9% had someone living alone who was 65 years of age or older. The average household size was 2.74 and the average family size was 3.57.

In the town, the population was spread out, with 30.7% under the age of 18, 11.6% from 18 to 24, 24.0% from 25 to 44, 18.9% from 45 to 64, and 14.9% who were 65 years of age or older. The median age was 33 years. For every 100 females, there were 89.5 males. For every 100 females age 18 and over, there were 88.6 males.

The median income for a household in the town was $19,196, and the median income for a family was $26,250. Males had a median income of $24,688 versus $15,250 for females. The per capita income for the town was $9,598. About 23.2% of families and 30.3% of the population were below the poverty line, including 45.4% of those under age 18 and 15.8% of those age 65 or over.

Transportation
Manzanola is part of Colorado's Bustang network. Is it along the Lamar-Pueblo-Colorado Springs Outrider line.

See also

 List of municipalities in Colorado
 Santa Fe Railway Manzanola Depot
 Manzanola Bridge

References

External links

 State government website for Manzanola
 Town of Manzanola contacts
 CDOT map of the Town of Manzanola

Towns in Otero County, Colorado
Towns in Colorado